Dinner Plain is a town in Victoria, Australia, located on the Great Alpine Road, 13 kilometres from Mount Hotham Alpine Resort, and 375 kilometres from Melbourne.

Dinner Plain is a thriving all-year-round resort with a wide range of summer activities such as bush walking, horse riding, mountain biking and tennis.

Dinner Plain has one ski tow for use during winter.

History
The late Holocene (pre-Contact) Aboriginal traditional owners of the Dinner Plain region were likely the Omeo tribe of the Yaitmatang (various spellings) language group (Howitt 1904). Other groups of Aboriginal people, including neighbouring Dhuduroa, Brabalung (Gunai-Kurnai) likely passed through and visited the Alpine area of Victoria's High Country. Gunn (2002) has suggested a widespread "confederacy" of tribes existed across the Australian Alps during the late Holocene. He further argues that these connections may have ancient origins that are evident through a common rock art style that emphasises human figures (Gunn 2002: 8). This alpine art style has origins in the mid-Holocene around 3500 BP, when the rock shelters of the region were primarily used for ritual purposes (Gunn 2002: 7–8), and is likely to precede the tribal boundaries encountered historically by thousands of years.

The tradition of hospitality at Dinner Plain goes back well over a century, when mountain cattlemen first arrived to rest and graze their cattle. When the coaches were running between Omeo and Bright, they would stop here for midday dinner, hence the area became known as Dinner Plain.

In 1987, Peter McIntyre and Harry Seidler shared the Zelman Cowan Award for non-residential architecture; McIntyre won for his design for the Ski Lodge at Dinner Plain.

References

HOWITT, A. W. 1904 The native tribes of South Eastern Australia. MacMillan, London. (Aboriginal Studies Press reprint 1996).
GUNN, R. G. 2002 Mudgegonga 2 and the Rock Art of North East Victoria. Rock Art Research 19: 1–17.

External links

The Alpine School

Towns in Victoria (Australia)
Alpine Shire